The men's 20 kilometre individual at the 1999 Asian Winter Games was held on 1 February 1999 at Yongpyong Cross Country Venue, South Korea.

Schedule
All times are Korea Standard Time (UTC+09:00)

Results

References

Results

External links
Schedule

Men individual